Entwistle railway station (first opened in 1848) is  north of Bolton and serves the village of Entwistle. It is also the closest station to Edgworth. Unlike  nearby  the station lies outside the Transport for Greater Manchester boundary, meaning that passengers cannot take advantage of their special offers and ticketing. Owing to the remote location and low passenger numbers, Entwistle has been a request stop for several years. It is served by Northern services on the Rochdale/Bolton 'Ribble Valley' Line towards Blackburn and Clitheroe in England.

History
The original station opened in August 1848, being relocated from Whittlestone Head station to the north. A more substantial stone building was built in 1859, as part of a larger contract, with similar stations being erected along the branch at The Oaks, Bromley Cross and Turton, by Manchester firm Joseph Greenup and Co. Demolition took place around the mid-1970s, several years after the station closed. The station exhibited a large outside wall platform clock. The 1859 contract was for both a station building and staff 'cottage' as erected at other stations along the branch. The station building was actually more extended than the buildings seen at the other stations, with private dwelling accommodation included for the station master.  The 1871 Census of Population revealed that resident at Entwistle Station was SM William Davies, 24, his wife Ann, 23 and infant daughter Mary, 1, plus two family visitors, one being the railway telegraph clerk at Clitheroe.  By the early 1900s, new accommodation was built for railway workers with the new railway terrace of cottages located on Overshores road, the lane beyond The Strawbury Duck Inn. The 1891 OS map survey revealed that only two immediately nearby cottages existed - The Strawbury Duck Inn (then called Bridge House) and also a divided cottage alongside, Bridge Cottages.

Entwistle served the Black Hill brickworks and Know Mill, sited where the smaller section of Wayoh reservoir occupies. Until recently the remains of an overhead cable railway, connecting the factory to the railway goods yard, were visible in an adjoining woods. The foundation bases for the supports are still visible in at least two locations. The mills were demolished when the level of the Wayoh Reservoir was raised and the station was reduced in size following the Beeching report of 1963 and the singling of the Bromley Cross to Blackburn section of the line a decade later. Entwistle goods yard closed in November 1959.

Signal box
Typically for this branch line, a Yardley/Smith type 1 brick signal box opened here in 1876, situated on the Down side north of the station, containing an 18 lever Smith frame. This box was replaced in Jan 1904 by a new 60 lever, gantry-mounted size 12 L&YR box, in connection with the quadrupling of the line through to Waltons Siding 1453 yds to the north. Numerous highly detailed large scale original drawings survive for these track and related works from the early 1900s Included with the plans is a letter sent by the railway company secretary to The Board of Trade in April 1904 which discloses that 'the old station has been reconstructed. It now consists of an island platform 596 feet long.' It is also revealed that the station is on a gradient of 1 in 77. The authorisation for it was the L&YR Act of 1897. The signal box spanned the fast running lines and it is reported that it was a very draughty place of work, with its floorboards lifting like piano keys when a loco steaming hard passed underneath it.  The box closed in 1968 when the through fast lines were taken out of use.

Media appearances
The station has been used as a location for filming on more than one occasion:

In the 1986 film adaptation of Jeffrey Archer's novel First Among Equals, the sequences at the fictional Redfern Station were filmed there.

In Episode 2 of Max and Paddy's Road to Nowhere, the station featured as "Middlewood station" (not to be confused with a real life station of the same name on the Buxton Line) due to its supposedly rural backwater location.

Services
Generally there is an hourly service daily northbound to Clitheroe and southbound to Manchester Victoria.

References

External links

West Pennine Moors
Railway stations in Blackburn with Darwen
DfT Category F2 stations
Former Lancashire and Yorkshire Railway stations
Railway stations in Great Britain opened in 1848
Northern franchise railway stations
Railway request stops in Great Britain